Siege of Edessa may refer to:
Siege of Edessa (163), Roman–Parthian Wars
Siege of Edessa (165), Roman–Parthian Wars
Siege of Edessa (503), Roman–Persian Wars
Siege of Edessa (544), Roman–Persian Wars
Siege of Edessa (1144), Crusades
Siege of Edessa (1146), Crusades

See also
 Battle of Edessa, between the Roman and Sassanid Empires, 260